GiantLeap is a child learning development evaluation tool that uses artificial intelligence gamification to turn the science of early childhood development into accessible and actionable insights for parents by producing a map of the child's early strengths and weaknesses. It started in 2018 and is headquartered in Los Angeles, California, United States.

History 
GiantLeap, Inc. was founded in 2018 by Ori Hofnung and Nadav Goshen. The idea behind GiantLeap is Hofnung's own learning challenges in his growing up years as he could not read until age 12 and saw how his parents got lost in the world of child development. In 2019, GiantLeap was accepted at the Texas Medical Center in Houston as part of their Innovation Institute, becoming the youngest company to be selected into their accelerator program. It partnered with Advantage Testing, a private tutorial and test preparation firm of America. In 2020, it received $900,000 pre-seed investment in a funding round involving American venture capital fund GoAhead Ventures, Texas Medical Center, and Fusion LA, an accelerator program for Israeli companies in the USA.

Product 
The GiantLeap child development evaluation tool is a system for receiving a comprehensive view of the child's developing brain, from advanced math, language, problem-solving, and motor abilities to social-emotional tendencies as well as challenges in these areas. The process is divided into two modules: the first module is a series of engaging games designed for a child as young as four and the second module is for parents to answer a detailed questionnaire and receive a fuller picture of the child’s functioning both at home and in school. Parents can repeat the questionnaire for revaluation and track progress. The app runs on both iPad and Android devices.

A team of scientists and pedagogical experts consisting of Sarit Ashkenazi, a neuropsychologist from the Hebrew University and the Stanford University; Lilla Dale McManis; educational psychologist; Hart Cohen, associate clinical professor of neurology at the University Of California and Cedars-Sinai Medical Center; and Ran Geva, a neurobiologist from Hebrew University took part in developing the child evaluation tool.

References 

2018 establishments in California
Child development
Privately_held_companies_based_in_California